The Kapoor family is a prominent Indian show business family with at least 4 generations of the family over  years in the Hindi film industry. Numerous members of the family, both biological and those who have married into the family, have had prolific careers as actors, film directors and producers. "The Pioneer" founder of the dynasty was "The Patriarch", Prithviraj Kapoor, who was the first member of family to begin acting in movies with his 1928 debut film Do Dhari Talwar. He was a pioneer of Indian theatre and the founding member of Indian People's Theatre Association (IPTA). His son Raj Kapoor was the most influential actor and director in Hindi cinema. The genesis generation or the earliest linear generation of the Kapoor family tree to ever act in the films was Prithviraj Kapoor's father, Basheshwarnath Kapoor, who debuted as actor in 1951 film Awaara, which was produced, directed and starred in lead role by his grandson Raj Kapoor.

Due to their decades old participation in the Hindi film industry, the family is often called "The First Family of Bollywood".

Prominent personalities related to the Kapoor family through marriage include Jennifer Kendal, Geeta Bali, Neetu Singh, Babita, Saif Ali Khan, Shweta Bachchan Nanda and Alia Bhatt.

Background 
The Kapoor family is of Punjabi Hindu Khatri origin belonging to the Kapoor gotra. 

Prithviraj Kapoor was the first from the family to pursue a career in films. He was born in Samundri, Lyallpur District, Punjab Province of British India. His father, Basheshwarnath Kapoor, served as a police officer in the Imperial Police in the city of Peshawar; while his grandfather, Keshavmal Kapoor, was a Tehsildar in Samundri. His younger brother, Trilok Kapoor also became an actor, his first role was in the film Char Darvesh in 1933, Trilok emerged as one of the most commercially successful actors of his era.

The family eventually migrated to Mumbai. Three of Prithviraj Kapoor's sons, Raj Kapoor, Shammi Kapoor and Shashi Kapoor made careers in the Hindi film industry. Raj Kapoor, also known as "the greatest showman of Indian cinema", became a noted Indian film actor, producer and director of Hindi cinema.

Raj Kapoor married Krishna Malhotra in 1946. She was the sister of actors Prem Nath, Rajendra Nath, and Narendra Nath, as well as Uma Chopra, the wife of Prem Chopra. They have 3 sons Randhir Kapoor, Rishi Kapoor, and Rajiv Kapoor and 2 daughters Ritu Nanda and Rima Jain.

Shammi Kapoor married actress Geeta Bali in 1955 and had 2 children with her, Aditya Raj Kapoor and Kanchan Kapoor. Geeta Bali died in 1965 due to smallpox. Shammi then married Neela Devi Gohil of the Gohil dynasty of the erstwhile Bhavnagar State in Gujarat in 1969

Shashi Kapoor married Jennifer Kendal in 1958. They have two sons, Kunal Kapoor, Karan Kapoor and a daughter Sanjana Kapoor. Jennifer died in 1984 due to Cancer.

Raj Kapoor's sons, Randhir Kapoor and Rishi Kapoor, went on to become well-known actors; his youngest son, Rajiv Kapoor, was not as successful as his brothers. Shashi Kapoor's children were unsuccessful in acting because of their European looks. His daughter, Sanjana Kapoor, currently runs the Prithvi Theatre, his first son, Kunal Kapoor, runs an add company, Shashi's youngest child, Karan Kapoor, currently runs a photography company in London. Shammi Kapoor's son, Aditya Raj Kapoor, is an Indian actor, filmmaker, and retired businessman.  
Shammi Kapoor's daughter Kanchan Kapoor is married to the son of Manmohan Desai.
  
Randhir Kapoor is married to Babita. They have two daughters Karisma Kapoor and Kareena Kapoor, both of whom have found success in the film industry. Rishi Kapoor was married to actress Neetu Singh, their son, Ranbir Kapoor, has established himself as a leading Bollywood actor, and their daughter, Riddhima Kapoor Sahani, is a designer.

Nikhil Nanda, son of Ritu Kapoor, Raj Kapoor's daughter and Rajan Nanda, is married to Shweta Bachchan, daughter of the actors Amitabh Bachchan and Jaya Bachchan.

Prithviraj Kapoor's cousin was Surinder Kapoor. Surinder Kapoor left Peshawar and came to Mumbai with help from Prithviraj Kapoor. Surinder Kapoor was married to Nirmal Kapoor. His oldest son is Boney Kapoor who was married to Mona Shourie and Sridevi and is the father of Arjun, Anshula, Janhvi, and Khushi Kapoor. His middle son is Anil Kapoor who is married to Sunita Kapoor and is the father of Sonam (married to Anand Ahuja), Rhea (married to Karan Boolani) and Harshvardhan Kapoor. His youngest son is Sanjay Kapoor who is married to Maheep Sandhu and is the father of Shanaya and Jahaan Kapoor. His daughter is Reena Kapoor Marwah who is married to Sandeep Marwah of Marwah Films and Video Studios and is the mother of Mohit (married to Antara Motiwala) and Akshay Marwah (married to Aashita Relan).

Noted actor Kamal Kapoor, who was famous for playing the role ‘Narrang’ in the 1978 blockbuster movie Don was the first cousisn of Prithviraj Kapoor (their mothers were sisters) and so were his brothers Nandkishore Kapoor and Ravindra Kapoor. Kamal Kapoor had five children including Kapil Kapoor and Madhu Behl who married Ramesh Behl. Madhu and Ramesh Behl's son is Goldie Behl, who is married to actress Sonali Bendre, thus the Behl family is also related to the Kapoor family.

Veteran character actor Subbiraj was the son of Kailash Kakkar, the sister of Prithviraj Kapoor and thus a first cousin of Raj Kapoor, Shammi Kapoor and Shashi Kapoor. His wife was Kumari Naaz.

Raj's, Shashi's, and Shammi's maternal cousin, Juggal Kishore Mehra, was a singer, whose step-granddaughter was Salma Agha who  became an actress and singer in Pakistan.

Members of the Kapoor family

First generation 
Kapoor family remains to be the only family in India to have four generations of film artists (c. 2009).

The first generation of the family was led by Prithviraj Kapoor. In 1928, Prithviraj Kapoor made his acting debut as an extra in his first film, Do Dhari Talwar.

Notable actors of this generation include:
 Prithviraj Kapoor – first son of Basheshwarnath Kapoor and the first member of family to enter the Hindi film industry; married to Ramsarni Mehra
 Trilok Kapoor – Second son of Basheshwarnath Kapoor who went on to become extremely popular in the role of lord Shiva in the 1950’s.

Second generation 
The second generation of the Kapoor family was led by three main Kapoor actors, Raj, and his younger brothers Shammi and Shashi. Among Kapoors of all generations, Raj Kapoor has been the most distinguished and prolific contributor as an actor, producer, director and in terms of his impact in enhancing Bollywood's international reach, India's soft power and diplomacy across the USSR, the Middle East, Africa and Palestine.

Notable actors of this generation include:
 Raj Kapoor – eldest son of Prithviraj Kapoor; married to Krishna Malhotra
 Shammi Kapoor – second son of Prithviraj Kapoor; married to Geeta Bali (first wife) and Neila Devi (second wife)
 Shashi Kapoor – youngest son of Prithviraj Kapoor; married to Jennifer Kendal
 Urmila Sial - daughter of Prithviraj Kapoor; married to Charanjit Sial
 Vijay Kapoor - son of Trilok Kapoor
 Vicky Kapoor - son of Trilok Kapoor
 Subbiraj Kakkar - son of Kailash Kakkar (née Kapoor, sister of Prithviraj and Trilok); married to Kumari Naaz

Third generation 
Rishi Kapoor, son of Raj Kapoor, led this generation and his two actor brothers Randhir and Rajeev remained in the shadow of his success. Rishi was best known as a romantic hero, his charm and charisma quickly made him one of Bollywood's leading men of the 1970s and ’80s, he later took on more supporting roles and character parts.

Notable people of this generation include:
 Randhir Kapoor  – eldest son of Raj Kapoor; married to Babita Kapoor
 Ritu Nanda  – elder daughter of Raj Kapoor; married to Rajan Nanda
 Rishi Kapoor  – second son of Raj Kapoor; married to Neetu Kapoor
 Rajiv Kapoor  – youngest son of Raj Kapoor
 Rima Jain - younger daughter of Raj Kapoor; married to Manoj Jain
 Aditya Raj Kapoor – son of Shammi Kapoor and Geeta Bali; married to Priti Kapoor
Kanchan Desai - daughter of Shammi Kapoor and Geeta Bali; married to Ketan Desai
 Kunal Kapoor – elder son of Shashi Kapoor and Jennifer Kendal
 Karan Kapoor – younger son of Shashi Kapoor and Jennifer Kendal
 Sanjana Kapoor – daughter of Shashi Kapoor and Jennifer Kendal; married to Valmik Thapar

Fourth generation 
This generation is dominated initially by Karishma Kapoor, Kareena Kapoor and Ranbir Kapoor.

Members of this generation include:
 Ranbir Kapoor — son of Rishi Kapoor and Neetu Singh, married to actress Alia Bhatt
 Kareena Kapoor Khan — younger daughter of Randhir Kapoor and Babita; married to actor Saif Ali Khan.
 Nikhil Nanda — son of Ritu Nanda and Rajan Nanda; married to Shweta Bachchan Nanda
Riddhima Kapoor Sahni - daughter of Rishi Kapoor and Neetu Singh, married to Bharat Sahni.
 Armaan Jain — elder son of Rima Jain and Manoj Jain, married to Anissa Malhotra Jain.
 Karisma Kapoor — elder daughter of Randhir Kapoor and Babita Shivdasani
 Nitasha Nanda — daughter of Ritu Nanda and Rajan Nanda
 Aadar Jain – younger Son of Rima Jain and Manoj Jain

Fifth generation

Members of this generation include:
 Raha Kapoor - daughter of Ranbir Kapoor and Alia Bhatt
 Samara Sahni- daughter of Riddhima Kapoor Sahni and Bharat Sahni
 Navya Naveli Nanda- daughter of Nikhil Nanda and Shweta Bachchan Nanda
 Agastya Nanda- son of Nikhil Nanda and Shweta Bachchan Nanda
 Samaira Kapur- daughter of Karisma Kapoor and Sunjay Kapur
 Kiaan Raj Kapur- son of Karisma Kapoor and Sunjay Kapur
 Taimur Ali Khan- eldest son of Kareena Kapoor Khan and Saif Ali Khan
 Jehangir Ali Khan- youngest son of Kareena Kapoor Khan and Saif Ali Khan

Kapoor Family Memorial at Rajbaugh

The Samadhi (memorial) of Raj Kapoor, also housing memorial of his mother and father Prithviraj Kapoor, is at their family farm "Rajbaugh", which means the "king of gardens". Located inside the MIT World Peace University (MIT-WPU), Rajbaugh lies off the NH65 on the banks of Mula-Mutha River in Loni Kalbhor village 30 km east of Pune in Maharshtra. Kapoor family sold a part of the 125 acres Rajbaugh to MIT-WPU which built a memorial for the Kapoor family on its campus. The memorial was unveiled in 2014 in the presence of Lata Mangeshkar and the Kapoor clan. The Kapoor family memorial has 7 pagodas showing elements of Raj Kapoor's movies and a museum or viewing gallery which shows family photographs and moments from his movie making from 1945 to 1990. Raj Kapoor shot many of his films at this farm, including Mera Naam Joker, Bobby, Satyam Shivam Sundaram, Prem Rog and more. Kapoor's family bungalow inside the farm has been preserved. The popular song "Hum Tum Ek Kamre Mein Band Ho" was shot inside this bungalow.

Family photos

See also
 List of Indian film families

References

External links 
 
 https://www.junglee.org.in/ (by Shammi Kapoor)

 
Punjabi Hindus
Punjabi people
Indian families
Hindu families
Bollywood film clans